Ballipadu may refer to any of the following places in Andhra Pradesh, India:

 Ballipadu, Palakol
 Ballipadu, Tallapudi